Liangyou Group, or Shanghai Liangyou Group Company Limited, is the largest state-owned food company in Shanghai and the sixth largest in China. Founded in 1998, it has more than 20 subsidiaries or affiliates. Its business is mainly in the field of food and oil storage, wholesale and processing, domestic and foreign bulk trade, import and export, chain sales, assets management and entity investment. Five of its brands are officially recognized as famous brands of Shanghai: Lehui rice, Haishi refined oil, Seagull condiment, Xuege flour and Weidu noodles.

In 2015, Liangyou Group was the 275th largest industrial company in China, with a revenue of 22.4 billion yuan.

References

External links
Official website

Companies based in Shanghai
Chinese companies established in 1998